Anaal Nathrakh are a British extreme metal band formed in 1999 in Birmingham by multi-instrumentalist Mick Kenney and vocalist Dave Hunt. They are currently signed to Metal Blade Records. The band's name is Irish for snake's breath (anál nathrach) and was taken from Merlin's Charm of Making in John Boorman's 1981 film Excalibur. The band recorded two demos in 1999, which were later released as an album.

The band has released eleven studio albums, one EP, and one compilation album. The band has been praised for mixing elements of grindcore, black metal, death metal, industrial, and other genres.

History

The band took their founding cues from Norwegian black metal bands such as Mayhem, Burzum, and Darkthrone. The duo recorded two demos before delivering their first full album, The Codex Necro, in 2001, that, according to The A.V. Club, "set a standard of blackened death that still hasn’t been equaled". 
In 2004, Anaal Nathrakh released their second full-length album, Domine Non Es Dignus, on the French label Season of Mist. In 2006, the group's third album, Eschaton (commonly referred to as the "end of the world" or "end times"), was released. The album featured guest appearances by Shane Embury of Napalm Death and Attila Csihar of Mayhem. The album Hell Is Empty and All the Devils Are Here was released through the band's new record label, FETO Records, in October 2007. The album features guest appearances from Joe Horvath of Circle of Dead Children.

In 2009, Anaal Nathrakh announced that they signed to record label Candlelight Records for their release of In the Constellation of the Black Widow. Commenting on the signing, V.I.T.R.I.O.L. stated, "Candlelight have shown a strong belief in Anaal Nathrakh and looking at some of the acts on their roster both past and present it seems they are capable of backing up their good intentions. With their help we hope we can finally get the planet cracked in half", and "Constellation will be faster, more insidious, more ominous, more musically dexterous and wilder than ever before. The album will feature a curve ball guest appearance from Zeitgeist Memento of Mexican extremists Repvblika."

Anaal Nathrakh released their sixth full-length album, Passion, in 2011, and their seventh, Vanitas, in 2012. The band finished recording for their eighth full-length album, Desideratum, in February 2014, and released the album on 28 October 2014. Desideratum was the band's first album release since signing to Metal Blade Records in June of the same year.

The band's ninth album, The Whole of the Law, was released on 28 October 2016. On 20 May 2018, it was revealed that they were going to release their tenth studio album, titled A New Kind of Horror. The album was released on 28 September 2018.

In early 2020, the band recorded their eleventh album, Endarkenment. The album was released on 2 October 2020. Metal Hammer named it as the 31st best metal album of 2020.

Musical style

Critics have said that the band fuses elements of symphonic black metal, black metal, death metal, grindcore, and industrial. 
They are mostly described as extreme metal, industrial death metal, industrial black metal, black metal, grindcore, and blackened death metal.

Band members

Current members
 Mick Kenney (Irrumator) – guitars, bass, drums, drum programming, programming (1999–present)
 Dave Hunt (V.I.T.R.I.O.L. [Visita Interiora Terræ Rectificando Invenies Occultum Lapidem]) – vocals (1999–present)

Additional live members
 Anil Carrier (Binah, No More Room in Hell, Towers of Flesh, Pernicion, The Solemn Curse) – drums  (2016–present) 
 Drunk (Duncan Wilkins) – bass, backing vocals (2011–present)
 Danilho Rosé (Dan Rose) – guitar (2011–present)
 Sam Loynes (Akercocke, Voices) – guitar (2022–present)

Past members
 Leicia – bass (1999–2000)

Past live members
 St. Evil (Steve Powell) – drums (2006–2016)
 Nicholas Barker – drums (2004)
 Shane Embury – bass (2004–2005)
 Danny Herrera – drums (2005)
 Misery (Paul Kenney) – bass (2006–2010)
 Ventnor – guitar (2005–2010)
 G Rash (James Walford) – guitar (2011–2017)

Discography

Studio albums
 The Codex Necro (2001)
 Domine Non Es Dignus (2004)
 Eschaton (2006)
 Hell Is Empty, and All the Devils Are Here (2007)
 In the Constellation of the Black Widow (2009)
 Passion (2011)
 Vanitas (2012)
 Desideratum (2014)
 The Whole of the Law (2016)
 A New Kind of Horror (2018)
 Endarkenment (2020)

EPs
 When Fire Rains Down from the Sky, Mankind Will Reap as It Has Sown (2003)

Compilation albums
 Total Fucking Necro (2002)

Demos
Anaal Nathrakh (1999)
Total Fucking Necro (1999)

Notes

References

Further reading

External links
 Official MySpace
 Official merchandise

English black metal musical groups
Blackened death metal musical groups
Musical groups established in 1999
Earache Records artists
Heavy metal duos
English musical duos
British industrial music groups
English death metal musical groups
English grindcore musical groups
Musical groups from Birmingham, West Midlands
Candlelight Records artists
Season of Mist artists
Metal Blade Records artists
British industrial metal musical groups
1999 establishments in England